Chris Baker (born 29 November 1969) is a race car driver. He raced in US Barber Formula Dodge in 2001, and in the Barber Dodge Pro Series from 2002 until 2003. He also raced in the National R/T 2000 Series. He won the Barber Dodge midwestern racing series of 2001.

Baker was born in Houston, Texas. He started racing karts from a young age. He is currently a racing instructor living in Austin, Texas.

Complete motorsports results

American Open-Wheel racing results
(key) (Races in bold indicate pole position, races in italics indicate fastest race lap)

Barber Dodge Pro Series

External links

1969 births
Living people
Racing drivers from Houston
Barber Pro Series drivers